What Lucía Saw is a 2022 Spanish-Colombian drama film directed by Imanol Uribe which stars Juana Acosta, Juan Carlos Martínez, Carmelo Gómez and Karra Elejalde. It is a dramatization of the 1989 murders of Jesuits in El Salvador by the Salvadoran Army.

Plot 
The plot follows the Central American University's cleaning staff Lucía Barrera de Cerna, a witness of the massacre of the 1989 murders of Jesuits in El Salvador by the Salvadoran Army, who stood up for truth and refused to cover up the responsibility of the military with the fake attribution of the crime to the FMLN guerrilla by the Salvadoran government, in the midst of the Salvadoran Civil War.

Cast

Production 
The film was originally known as  early in the production stage. The screenplay was penned by Daniel Cebrián. The film was  produced by Bowfinger International Pictures, Tornasol Media and Nunca digas nunca AIE alongside 64A Films, and it had the participation of RTVE and Movistar+ and support from ICAA, the Ibermedia programme and ICO. Shooting began by November 2020 in Navarre. It later moved to Colombia, shooting in Valle del Cauca in between Cali and Buga.

Release 
The film was presented on 21 March 2022 at the 25th Málaga Film Festival, as part of the festival's main competition. Distributed by Karma Films, it opened in Spanish theatres on 25 March 2022.

Reception 
Sergio F. Pinilla of Cinemanía rated the film with 4 out of 5 stars, underscoring that Acosta shines in Uribe's return to political thriller.

Juan Pando of Fotogramas gave it 3 out of 5 stars, highlighting "the innocence of the protagonist in the face of the surrounding horror", while considering that the negative characters were not sufficiently humanised as a drawback.

Manuel J. Lombardo of Diario de Sevilla gave a negative review and 2 stars, deeming the film, weighed down by several bad decisions, to be a "discursive, superficial, leaden work", "with no real context, political bite nor dramatic tension".

Jonathan Holland of ScreenDaily deemed What Lucía Saw to be a "well-intentioned but uneven" film, pointing out that some people will wonder "how it is possible to extract so little tension from such a subject".

See also 
 List of Spanish films of 2022

References

External links 
 What Lucía Saw at ICAA's Catálogo de Cinespañol

Spanish drama films
Colombian drama films
Tornasol Films films
Films set in El Salvador
Films set in 1989
Films shot in Navarre
Films shot in Colombia
Films about the Salvadoran Civil War
Bowfinger International Pictures films
2022 drama films
2022 films
2020s Spanish-language films
2020s Spanish films
2020s Colombian films